Yanin "Jeeja" Vismitananda, née Nicharee Vismitananda (born 31 March 1984) is a Thai actress and martial artist. She specialises in Muay Thai. She is credited as Yanin Mitananda in Chocolate.

Early life and education
Vismitananda was born in Bangkok to Prasita Vismitananda and Pawadol Borirak, a businessman who later died when Vismitananda was 17. She has an older brother, Nantapong "Jeed" Vismitananda. She is of Burmese, Chinese, English and Thai heritage. Vismitananda holds a 4th Dan black belt in taekwondo. She received a bachelor's degree from Kasem Bundit University.

Career
Vismitananda was discovered by Prachya Pinkaew in 2003.

Her film debut was the starring role in the film Chocolate (2008), and her second movie was Raging Phoenix (2008).

Personal life
On 29 August 2012, Vismitananda revealed that she was five months pregnant, and married Adrian Robert Bowden, a co-star in her previous films and a younger brother of Thai singer Pamela Bowden. She also stated that she planned to suspend work for the following two years.

Vismitananda gave birth to a son, Jayden Bowden Vismitananda (เจย์เดน เบาว์เดน วิสมิตะนันทน์), on 22 January 2013.

Filmography

Television series

References

External links

Jeeja Yanin on Facebook
Jeeja Yanin on Instagram

1984 births
Living people
Yanin Vismitananda
Yanin Vismitananda
Yanin Vismitananda
Yanin Vismitananda
Yanin Vismitananda
Yanin Vismitananda
Yanin Vismitananda
Yanin Vismitananda
Yanin Vismitananda
Yanin Vismitananda
Yanin Vismitananda
Yanin Vismitananda
Yanin Vismitananda
Yanin Vismitananda